John Reuben Geddes (born 13 August 1936) is a former British track cyclist.

Cycling career
He competed at the 1956 Summer Olympics where he won a bronze medal in the Men's Team Pursuit.

He represented England in the road race and 10 miles scratch race at the 1958 British Empire and Commonwealth Games in Cardiff, Wales.

References

External links

 

1936 births
Living people
English male cyclists
English track cyclists
Cyclists at the 1956 Summer Olympics
Olympic bronze medallists for Great Britain
Sportspeople from Liverpool
Olympic cyclists of Great Britain
Olympic medalists in cycling
Medalists at the 1956 Summer Olympics
Cyclists at the 1958 British Empire and Commonwealth Games
Commonwealth Games competitors for England